The Celier Kiss is a series of Polish autogyros that was designed by Frenchman Raphael Celier and produced by his company, Celier Aviation of Jaktorów-Kolonia, Poland. When it was available the aircraft was supplied as a kit for amateur construction or as a complete ready-to-fly-aircraft.

Design and development
The tandem seat Kiss series was designed as a complement to the side-by-side configuration Celier Xenon 2 series of autogyros. The Kiss series all feature a single main rotor, tricycle landing gear, a low-set T-tail and a choice of engines, all mounted in pusher configuration.

Variants
Kiss 582
A proposed single seat variant under development in 2011. It will be powered by the twin cylinder, liquid-cooled, two-stroke, dual-ignition  Rotax 582 engine. The cockpit will be either partially or, optionally, fully enclosed.
Kiss 912
Base model, with two seats in tandem, powered by a four cylinder, air and liquid-cooled, four-stroke, dual-ignition  Rotax 912UL engine in pusher configuration. The cockpit has a semi-enclosed fairing with a windshield.
Kiss 912S
Upgraded model, with two seats in tandem, powered by a four cylinder, air and liquid-cooled, four-stroke, dual-ignition  Rotax 912ULS engine in pusher configuration. The cockpit has a fully enclosed fairing.
Kiss 914
Turbocharged model, with two seats in tandem, powered by a four cylinder, air and liquid-cooled, four-stroke, dual-ignition  Rotax 914 engine in pusher configuration. The cockpit has a fully enclosed fairing.

Specifications (912)

References

External links

2000s Polish sport aircraft
Homebuilt aircraft
Single-engined pusher autogyros
Twin-boom aircraft